Zach Darbast (also Romanized as Zāch Dārbast) is a village in Jakdan Rural District, in the Central District of Bashagard County, Hormozgan Province, Iran. At the 2006 census, its population was 119, in 25 families.

References 

Populated places in Bashagard County